The LNB Pro A Best Young Player Award is an annual LNB Pro A  award given to the top player under the age of 22 years old.

Winners

Awards by player

Awards by nationality

References

LNB Pro A awards
European basketball awards